The 1993 Mid-Eastern Athletic Conference men's basketball tournament took place March 3–6, 1993, at the Norfolk Scope in Norfolk, Virginia. Coppin State defeated , 80–53 in the championship game, to win its 2nd MEAC Tournament title.

The Eagles earned an automatic bid to the 1993 NCAA tournament as No. 15 seed in the East region. In the round of 64, Coppin State fell to No. 2 seed Cincinnati 93–66.

Format
All nine conference members participated, with the top 7 teams receiving a bye to the quarterfinal round.

Bracket

* denotes overtime period

References

MEAC men's basketball tournament
1992–93 Mid-Eastern Athletic Conference men's basketball season
MEAC men's basketball tournament
Basketball competitions in Norfolk, Virginia
College basketball tournaments in Virginia